Alpha Kaba (born 29 January 1996) is a French-Guinean professional basketball player for Budućnost VOLI in the Prva A Liga and the ABA League. He plays for the Guinea national basketball team.

Career 
He spent the early parts of his career at Romorantin-Lanthenay town where he had grown up. From 2009 to 2011, Kaba played for ADA Blois before joining the youth ranks of Elan Bearnais Pau-Lacq-Orthez. He made his professional debut in the French elite league Pro A on 26 September 2014, tallying two points and four rebounds in nine minutes of play against Entente Orléans 45.

In July 2015, Kaba signed with Serbian club Mega Leks. In his second season with the Mega Leks, Kaba became the Adriatic League's leading rebounder for the entire 2016-17 season. In 2016, Kaba originally entered his name for the 2016 NBA draft, but ultimately withdrew his name on the day of the international deadline. A year later, he put his name as an international entry for the 2017 NBA draft. On 22 June 2017 Kaba was selected with the final pick in the 2017 NBA draft by the Atlanta Hawks.

On 28 July 2017 Kaba signed a three-year contract with ASVEL Basket. 

On 18 September 2019 he signed with Boulazac Basket Dordogne of LNB Pro A. He averaged 8.8 points and 8.6 rebounds per game. Kaba signed with Nanterre 92 on 3 July 2020. On 21 November he was named EuroCup player of the week, after posting 21 points and twelve rebounds in a win against Aquila Basket Trento.

On 28 July 2021, Kaba signed with Gaziantep of the ING Basketbol Süper Ligi. He was named the MVP of the regular season after helping Gaziantep finish in the fourth place, while averaging 13.5 points and 10.5 rebounds per game.

On 4 August 2022, Kaba signed for Budućnost VOLI.

International career 
In 2014, Kaba played for the French under 18 national team at the Albert-Schweitzer-Tournament in Germany and at the European Championships in Turkey, earning Eurobasket.com All-European Championships U18 Honorable Mention.

He helped the French under 20 national team reach the semifinals of the 2015 European Championships in Italy.

In his senior career, Kaba switched to play for the Guinea national basketball team.

Personal life
Kaba is of Guinean descent.

See also
 List of NBA drafted players from Serbia

References

External links 
 Alpha Kaba at aba-liga.com
 Alpha Kaba at eurobasket.com
 Alpha Kaba at realgm.com
 Alpha Kaba at tblstat.net

1996 births
Living people
ABA League players
ASVEL Basket players
Atlanta Hawks draft picks
Black French sportspeople
Centers (basketball)
Élan Béarnais players
French expatriate basketball people in Serbia
French men's basketball players
French sportspeople of Guinean descent
Gaziantep Basketbol players
Guinean men's basketball players
KK Mega Basket players
Nanterre 92 players
Power forwards (basketball)
Sportspeople from Blois